Flavius Julius Constans ( 323 – 350), sometimes called Constans I, was Roman emperor from 337 to 350. He held the imperial rank of caesar from 333, and was the youngest son of Constantine the Great.

After his father's death, he was made augustus alongside his brothers in September 337. Constans was given the administration of the praetorian prefectures of Italy, Illyricum, and Africa. He defeated the Sarmatians in a campaign shortly afterwards. Quarrels over the sharing of power led to a civil war with his eldest brother and co-emperor Constantine II, who invaded Italy in 340 and was killed in battle by Constans's forces near Aquileia. Constans gained from him the praetorian prefecture of Gaul. Thereafter there were tensions with his remaining brother and co-augustus Constantius II, including over the exiled bishop Athanasius of Alexandria. In the following years he campaigned against the Franks, and in 343 he visited Roman Britain, the last legitimate emperor to do so.

In January 350, Magnentius the commander of the Jovians and Herculians, a corps in the Roman army, was acclaimed augustus at Augustodunum (Autun) with the support of Marcellinus, the comes rei privatae. Magnentius overthrew and killed Constans. Surviving sources, possibly influenced by the propaganda of Magnentius's faction, accuse Constans of misrule and of homosexuality.

Early life
Constans was probably born in 323. He was the third and youngest son of Constantine I and Fausta, his father's second wife. He was the grandson of both the augusti Constantius I and Maximian. When he was born his father Constantine was the empire's senior augustus, and at war with his colleague and brother-in-law Licinius I. At the time of Constans's birth, his eldest brother Constantine II and his half-brother Crispus, Constantine's first-born son, already held the rank of caesar. Constans's half-aunt Constantia, a daughter of Constantius I, was Licinius's wife and mother to another caesar, Licinius II.

After the defeat of Licinius by Crispus at the Battle of the Hellespont and at the Battle of Chrysopolis by Constantine, Licinius and his son were spared at Constantine's half-sister's urging. Licinius was executed on a pretext shortly afterwards. In 326, Constans's mother Fausta was also put to death on Constantine's orders, as were Constans's half-brother Crispus and Licinius II. This left Constans's branch of the Constantinian dynasty – descended from Constantius I's relationship with Helena – in control of the imperial college.

According to the works of both Ausonius and Libanius he was educated at Constantinople under the tutelage of the poet Aemilius Magnus Arborius, who instructed him in Latin.

Reign

Caesar 
On 25 December 333, his father Constantine I elevated Constans to the imperial rank of caesar at Constantinople. He was nobilissimus caesar alongside his brothers Constantine II and Constantius II. Constans became engaged to Olympias, the daughter of the praetorian prefect Ablabius, but the marriage never came to pass. Official imagery was changed to accommodate an image of Constans as co-caesar beside his brothers and their father the augustus.

It is possible that the occasion of Constans's elevation to the imperial college was timed to coincide with the celebration of the millennium of the city of Byzantium, whose re-foundation as Constantinople Constantine had begun the previous decade. In 248, Rome had celebrated its own millennium, the Secular Games, in the reign of Philip the Arab. Philip may also have raised his son to co-augustus at the start of the anniversary year. Rome had been calculated by the 1st-century BC Latin author Marcus Terentius Varro to have been founded by Romulus in 753 BC. Byzantium was thought to have been founded in 667 BC by Byzas, according to the reckoning derived from the Histories of Herodotus, the 5th-century BC Greek historian, and the writings of Constantine's court historian Eusebius of Caesarea in his Chronicon.

Augustus 
With Constantine's death in 337, Constans and his two brothers, Constantine II and Constantius II, divided the Roman world among themselves and disposed of virtually all relatives who could possibly have a claim to the throne. The army proclaimed them augusti on 9 September 337. Almost immediately, Constans was required to deal with a Sarmatian invasion in late 337, in which he won a resounding victory.

Constans managed to extract the prefecture of Illyricum and the diocese of Thrace, provinces that were originally to be ruled by his cousin Dalmatius, as per Constantine I's proposed division after his death. Constantine II soon complained that he had not received the amount of territory that was his due as the eldest son.

Annoyed that Constans had received Thrace and Macedonia after the death of Dalmatius, Constantine demanded that Constans hand over the African provinces, which he agreed to do in order to maintain a fragile peace.  Soon, however, they began quarreling over which parts of the African provinces belonged to Carthage and Constantine, and which parts belonged to Italy and Constans. This led to growing tensions between the two brothers, which were only heightened by Constans finally coming of age and Constantine refusing to give up his guardianship. In 340 Constantine II invaded Italy. Constans, at that time in Dacia, detached and sent a select and disciplined body of his Illyrian troops, stating that he would follow them in person with the remainder of his forces. Constantine was eventually trapped at Aquileia, where he died, leaving Constans to inherit all of his brother's former territories – Hispania, Britannia and Gaul.

Constans began his reign in an energetic fashion. In 341–342, he led a successful campaign against the Franks, and in the early months of 343 he visited Britain, probably as part of a military campaign.

Regarding religion, Constans was tolerant of Judaism and promulgated an edict banning pagan sacrifices in 341. He suppressed Donatism in Africa and supported Nicene orthodoxy against Arianism, which was championed by his brother Constantius. Although Constans called the Council of Serdica in 343 to settle the conflict, it was a complete failure, and by 346 the two emperors were on the point of open warfare over the dispute.

Homosexuality
Surviving sources, possibly influenced by the propaganda of Magnentius's faction, accuse Constans of misrule and of homosexuality. The Roman historian Eutropius says Constans "indulged in great vices," in reference to his homosexuality, and Aurelius Victor stated that Constans had a reputation for scandalous behaviour with "handsome barbarian hostages." Nevertheless, Constans did sponsor a decree alongside Constantius II that ruled that marriage based on "unnatural" sex should be punished meticulously. However, according to John Boswell, it was likely that Constans promulgated the legislation under pressure from the growing band of Christian leaders, in an attempt to placate public outrage at his own perceived indecencies.

Death
In the final years of his reign, Constans developed a reputation for cruelty and misrule. Dominated by favourites and openly preferring his select bodyguard, he lost the support of the legions. On 18 January 350, the general Magnentius declared himself emperor at Augustodunum (Autun) with the support of the troops on the Rhine frontier and, later, the western provinces of the Empire. Constans was enjoying himself nearby when he was notified of the elevation of Magnentius. Lacking any support beyond his immediate household, he was forced to flee for his life. As he was trying to reach Hispania, supporters of Magnentius cornered him in a fortification in Helena (Elne) in the eastern Pyrenees of southwestern Gaul, where he was killed after seeking sanctuary in a temple. An alleged prophecy at his birth had said Constans would die "in the arms of his grandmother". His place of death happens to have been named after Helena, mother of Constantine and his own grandmother, thus realizing the prophecy.

Family tree

Emperors are shown with a rounded-corner border with their dates as Augusti, names with a thicker border appear in both sections

1: Constantine's parents and half-siblings

2: Constantine's children

See also

Itineraries of the Roman emperors, 337–361

References

Sources

Primary sources
 Zosimus, Historia Nova II
 Aurelius Victor, Epitome de Caesaribus
 Eutropius, Breviarium ab urbe condita

Secondary sources
 DiMaio, Michael; Frakes, Robert,  Constans I (337–350 A.D.) (Archive), De Imperatoribus Romanis 
 
 Gibbon, Edward (1888) The History of the Decline and Fall of the Roman Empire
 Norwich, John Julius (1989) Byzantium: The Early Centuries, Guild Publishing

External links
 

320s births
350 deaths
4th-century Christians
4th-century murdered monarchs
4th-century Roman consuls
4th-century Roman emperors
Constantine the Great
Constantinian dynasty
Flavii
Julii
LGBT Roman emperors
Murdered Roman emperors
People executed by the Roman Empire
Sons of Roman emperors